Dachny (masculine), Dachnaya (feminine), or Dachnoye (neuter) is the name of several rural localities in Russia.

Modern localities
Dachny, Chelyabinsk Oblast, a settlement in Kosobrodsky Selsoviet of Troitsky District in Chelyabinsk Oblast
Dachny, Kurgan Oblast, a settlement in Tagilsky Selsoviet of Kargapolsky District in Kurgan Oblast; 
Dachny, Lipetsk Oblast, a settlement in Bratovsky Selsoviet of Chaplyginsky District in Lipetsk Oblast; 
Dachny, Republic of Mordovia, a settlement in Dachny Selsoviet of Tengushevsky District in the Republic of Mordovia; 
Dachny, Novgorod Oblast, a settlement in Bolshevisherskoye Settlement of Malovishersky District in Novgorod Oblast
Dachny, Omsk Oblast, a settlement in Nadezhdinsky Rural Okrug of Omsky District in Omsk Oblast; 
Dachny, Penza Oblast, a settlement in Plessky Selsoviet of Mokshansky District in Penza Oblast
Dachny, Bagayevsky District, Rostov Oblast, a settlement in Bagayevskoye Rural Settlement of Bagayevsky District in Rostov Oblast; 
Dachny, Kagalnitsky District, Rostov Oblast, a khutor in Kirovskoye Rural Settlement of Kagalnitsky District in Rostov Oblast; 
Dachny, Tselinsky District, Rostov Oblast, a khutor in Sredneyegorlykskoye Rural Settlement of Tselinsky District in Rostov Oblast; 
Dachny, Sverdlovsk Oblast, a settlement in Dachny Selsoviet under the administrative jurisdiction of the City of Krasnouralsk in Sverdlovsk Oblast
Dachny, Bologovsky District, Tver Oblast, a settlement in Ryutinskoye Rural Settlement of Bologovsky District in Tver Oblast
Dachny, Zapadnodvinsky District, Tver Oblast, a settlement in Sharapovskoye Rural Settlement of Zapadnodvinsky District in Tver Oblast
Dachnoye, Sudak, Republic of Crimea, a selo under the administrative jurisdiction of the town of republic significance of Sudak in the Republic of Crimea
Dachnoye, Bakhchisaraysky District, Republic of Crimea, a selo in Bakhchisaraysky District of the Republic of Crimea
Dachnoye, Ivanovo Oblast, a selo in Vichugsky District of Ivanovo Oblast
Dachnoye, Chernyakhovsky District, Kaliningrad Oblast, a settlement in Kaluzhsky Rural Okrug of Chernyakhovsky District in Kaliningrad Oblast
Dachnoye, Zelenogradsky District, Kaliningrad Oblast, a settlement in Kovrovsky Rural Okrug of Zelenogradsky District in Kaliningrad Oblast
Dachnoye, Leningrad Oblast, a settlement under the administrative jurisdiction of Pavlovskoye Settlement Municipal Formation in Kirovsky District of Leningrad Oblast; 
Dachnoye, Republic of North Ossetia-Alania, a selo in Kurtatsky Rural Okrug of Prigorodny District in the Republic of North Ossetia-Alania; 
Dachnoye, Pskov Oblast, a settlement in Dnovsky District of Pskov Oblast
Dachnoye, Sakhalin Oblast, a selo in Korsakovsky District of Sakhalin Oblast
Dachnoye, Republic of Tatarstan, a settlement in Vysokogorsky District of the Republic of Tatarstan
Dachnoye, Vologda Oblast, a village in Sukhonsky Selsoviet of Mezhdurechensky District in Vologda Oblast
Dachnaya, Beloretsky District, Republic of Bashkortostan, a village in Sermenevsky Selsoviet of Beloretsky District in the Republic of Bashkortostan
Dachnaya, Blagoveshchensky District, Republic of Bashkortostan, a village in Pokrovsky Selsoviet of Blagoveshchensky District in the Republic of Bashkortostan
Dachnaya, Irkutsk Oblast, a settlement in Shelekhovsky District of Irkutsk Oblast

Alternative names
Dachny, alternative name of Sadovy, a settlement in Nachalovsky Selsoviet of Privolzhsky District in Astrakhan Oblast;

Notes